The 2008 Toronto Argonauts season was the 51st season for the team in the Canadian Football League and 136th season overall. The Argonauts attempted to win their 16th Grey Cup, but they failed to make the playoffs ending the season on a nine-game losing streak.

Offseason

CFL draft
In the 2008 CFL Draft, 48 players were chosen from among 752 eligible players from Canadian universities across the country, as well as Canadian players playing in the NCAA. The first two rounds were broadcast on TSN.ca with host Rod Black.

Notable transactions

 The Toronto Argonauts signed former National Football League receiver/kick-returner Bethel Johnson on May 26. Johnson is a two-time Super Bowl champion, who posted a league-best 28.2-yard kickoff return average as a rookie in 2003 with the New England Patriots. Johnson signed with the Argos on Monday, May 26.
 Damon Allen, 44, announced his retirement from the CFL on May 28. Allen had maintained during the offseason that he intended to attend training camp and compete for the starter's job. Allen would have gone into camp third on the depth chart behind newly acquired Kerry Joseph and veteran Michael Bishop, both of whom signed new deals with the Argos in the off-season.

Allen retires as pro football's career passing leader with 72,381 yards. He played on four Grey Cup-winning teams and in 2005, he captured the league's outstanding player award.

 June 5, 2008: The Argos acquired running back Jamal Robertson from the Saskatchewan Roughriders for Canadian cornerback Leron Mitchell. He was a former University of Western Ontario Mustangs star who this off-season had a workout with the NFL's Dallas Cowboys.

Rosters

Preseason roster
As of June 10, 2008

End of season roster

Schedule

Preseason

Regular season

Regular season
Toronto started the season off well, winning against the Blue Bombers 23–16, but after that they compiled a 2–5 record the next 7 games. After the Bye week, everything went downhill, they won only one game and lost 9 start to finish the season 4–14 and missed the playoffs.

A raucous Labour Day crowd of 25,911 at Ivor Wynne Stadium witnessed a game that ended with a 34–31 Argo victory, the team's first win against the Hamilton Tiger-Cats of the season. Argo head coach Rich Stubler's job was rumoured to be on the line. Argos receiver Arland Bruce III found time for a little theatrics, celebrating an 11-yard TD catch by donning a Spider-Man mask produced from his pants. Several days later, the Canadian Football League fined the Argonauts receiver an undisclosed amount for his touchdown celebration. Game officials had handed Bruce an objectionable conduct penalty after the incident. Bruce went on to have his best game of the season, catching 10 passes for a game-high 149 yards.

On September 9, Stubler was released as head coach of the Argonauts after posting a 4–6 record. There was the belief he could not get along with those he worked with. The Argos hired Don Matthews, the head coach with the most wins in CFL history and head coach during Toronto's back-to-back Grey Cup victories in 1996 and 1997, to return to the club as head coach for the third time in his coaching career.

During the team's next game on September 12 at Rogers Centre, Winnipeg Blue Bombers slotback Milt Stegall became the most prolific receiver in the history of the CFL. The slotback caught a 92-yard pass at 9:02 in the second quarter to raise his career total to 14,983, breaking the mark of 14,891 yards previously held by former Stampeders receiver Allen Pitts. Stegall took a pass from Kevin Glenn and scored a touchdown, his second of the game. It put the Bombers ahead 28–3.

On October 31, Matthews resigned from the Argonauts a day after the conclusion of the Argonauts 2008 regular season, which saw the Argos fail to win a game in the eight games under his leadership and finishing out of the playoffs for the first time since the 2001 CFL season.

Season standings

Statistics

Offence

Passing

Rushing

Receiving

Defence

Postseason
The Argos finished third in the East Division with a record of 4 wins and 14 losses. The Edmonton Eskimos, who finished fourth in the West, had a better record of 10 and 8, and under the cross-over rule eliminated Toronto from the playoffs and play the Winnipeg Blue Bombers in the East semi-final.

Awards and records
 Arland Bruce, Eastern Division All-Star, Offence
 Jonathan Brown, CFL Eastern All-Star, Defence
 Dominique Dorsey, CFL Eastern All-Star, Special Teams
 John Agro Special Teams Award – Dominique Dorsey (RB), Toronto Argonauts
 Kenny Wheaton, CFL Eastern All-Star, Defence

Milestones

References

Further reading
 On training camp

External links
 2008 Toronto Argonauts Season
 Official CFL team training camp preview

Toronto Argonauts
Toronto Argonauts seasons